Chimfunshi Wildlife Orphanage is a sanctuary for chimpanzees, located in Zambia's Copperbelt Province. Chimfunshi started as a family-run wildlife orphanage, and today Chimfunshi is managed by a board of trustees to ensure the long-term sustainability of the sanctuary. Chimfunshi was founded in 1983 when a game ranger brought a badly wounded infant chimpanzee to the cattle ranch of David and Sheila Siddle. The Siddles nursed that chimp – named "Pal" – back to health, thereby establishing a tradition of care and respect that forms the legacy of the sanctuary.  Once word of Pal's recovery spread, the Siddles were inundated with orphaned chimpanzees. Although many of the chimpanzees were confiscated from poachers who attempted to smuggle the infants into Zambia for sale as pets, an equally large number were rescued from dilapidated zoos and circuses from all over Africa, Asia, Europe and South America. With over 145 chimpanzees, Chimfunshi is now one of the largest chimpanzee sanctuaries in the world.

The orphanage is home to other rescued animals such as baboons, vervet monkeys, parrots, antelopes, owls, buzzards, sheep, and peacocks.

Chimfunshi is recognized as an “Important Bird Area” (IBA #22), an area recognized as being a globally important habitat for the conservation of bird populations. Chimfunshi is one of about 10,000 IBAs worldwide. Some of the species that can be found at Chimfunshi are: pale-billed hornbill, coppery tailed coucal, Miombo Scrub robin, red-capped Crombec, white-headed black chat, chestnut-backed Sparrow-Weaver, and broad-tailed Paradise-Whydah.  

Located 65 km west of Chingola on the banks of the Kafue River, the orphanage is a tourist attraction for those living in the Copperbelt towns and for international visitors to Zambia. Chimpanzees are not found in the wild in Zambia, the nearest populations are about 500 km north of Chimfunshi, but wildlife smuggling routes out of the Congo pass through Zambia.

The sanctuary is a member of the Pan African Sanctuary Alliance.

In 2002, Sheila Siddle published her autobiography, In My Family Tree: A Life With Chimpanzees, to widespread acclaim. The Siddles were awarded the Jane Goodall Award for establishing Chimfunshi.

Research
Chimfunshi has evolved into a major centre for education and research. The sanctuary offers the unique opportunity to observe the complex social behaviour of chimpanzees in their almost natural habitat and in large social groups. It also allows a number of social and educational projects in the field and a chance to get to know the people and culture of Zambia.

Animal welfare and research thus complement each other perfectly: primate researchers from around the world come to Chimfunshi to investigate the chimpanzees’ social behavior, communication and cognition. Scientists conduct observational studies while learning about the daily lives of people in an African country. In addition to observations of the chimpanzees that teach some students the methods of behavioural research, field trips are offered to investigate the unique flora and fauna of Zambia.

The Education Center at Chimfunshi not only attracts international primate researchers but also students from America and Europe, as well as school classes and their teachers from Zambia. Chimfunshi works closely and regularly with scientists from the Max Planck Institutes for Evolutionary Anthropology (Leipzig, Germany), and for Psycholinguistics (Nijmegen, Netherlands), the Free University of Berlin, and Gonzaga University's fh in the U.S.

Volunteering
Chimfunshi Wildlife Orphanage and their partner, African Impact, offer a volunteer program for supporters. Volunteers help care for chimpanzees through behavioural enrichment activities, infrastructure development and community farming initiatives.

References

External links
Chimfunshi's homepage

Organizations established in 1983
Primate sanctuaries
Tourist attractions in Zambia
Buildings and structures in Copperbelt Province
Tourist attractions in Copperbelt Province
Animal welfare organisations based in Zambia
Important Bird Areas of Zambia